Edenville Township is a civil township of Midland County in the U.S. state of Michigan.  As of the 2000 census, the township population was 2,528.

Geography

Demographics
As of the census of 2000, there were 2,528 people, 988 households, and 741 families residing in the township. The racial makeup of the township was 97.94% White, 0.04% African American, 0.51% Native American, 0.28% Asian, 0.24% from other races, and 0.99% from two or more races. Hispanic or Latino of any race were 0.55% of the population.

There were 988 households, out of which 30.2% had children under the age of 18 living with them, 64.2% were married couples living together, 6.1% had a female householder with no husband present, and 25.0% were non-families. 18.9% of all households were made up of individuals, and 5.2% had someone living alone who was 65 years of age or older.  The average household size was 2.56 and the average family size was 2.91.

In the township the population was spread out, with 24.0% under the age of 18, 7.4% from 18 to 24, 29.5% from 25 to 44, 28.7% from 45 to 64, and 10.4% who were 65 years of age or older.  The median age was 39 years. For every 100 females, there were 98.7 males.  For every 100 females age 18 and over, there were 100.9 males.

The median income for a household in the township was $42,847, and the median income for a family was $46,118. Males had a median income of $42,100 versus $26,891 for females. The per capita income for the township was $20,470.  About 6.8% of families and 8.1% of the population were below the poverty line, including 12.0% of those under age 18 and 4.8% of those age 65 or over.

References

External links
Edenville Township website
 

Townships in Midland County, Michigan
Townships in Michigan
1873 establishments in Michigan
Populated places established in 1873